The 1888 Massachusetts gubernatorial election was held on November 6, 1888. Incumbent Republican Governor Oliver Ames was re-elected to a third term in office, defeating Democratic Mayor of Cambridge William Russell.

General election

Results

See also
 1888 Massachusetts legislature

References

Governor
1888
Massachusetts
November 1888 events